May is an unincorporated community in Pocahontas County, West Virginia, United States.

References

Unincorporated communities in Pocahontas County, West Virginia
Unincorporated communities in West Virginia